Snorre can refer to either of the following:

 a Norwegian male name.
 famed Icelandic writer Snorre Sturlason
 an alternate name of Heimskringla, the saga Snorre Sturlason wrote about the Viking age.
 the Snorre oil field in the Norwegian sector of the North Sea.
 Snorre Bjerck
 Snorre Valen